plan is a calendar and day planner program for the X Window System based on the Motif widget set. plan is free software released under a custom permissive license.

Its main window shows a month (the current one by default); the user can insert appointments at given days and time. An accompanying program pland reminds the user of appointments by showing a warning window or running an arbitrary shell script. Other features of plan are:

 configurability of warnings
 week/month/year views
 periodic appointments
 appointment types
 client/server multiuser mode

See also
List of personal information managers

External links
 Plan Web page

Unix software
Free calendaring software
plan